Simitis is a surname. Notable people with the surname include:

Costas Simitis (born 1936), Greek politician
Ilse Grubrich-Simitis, German psychoanalyst
Spiros Simitis (born 1934), German jurist